Killarney Mountain Lodge is a resort located on a large Georgian Bay waterfront property in Killarney, Ontario. This lodge draws many people from local Ontarians to Americans due to its scenic views and a large variety of outdoor activities and guest accommodations. The lodge has overgone many renovations over the years to become the place that it is today. Located on the property is the Canada House Conference Centre, the largest log-built conference centre in the world.  This large structure was designed in 2016 by R. Tomè + Associates. The Name Canada House comes from the local techniques, people and materials that were all brought together in the completion of this structure. Construction started in 2017 and the building was finished in 2019.

History 
In the 1950s the Fruehauf Trailer Corporation bought the Killarney Mountain Lodge. They purchased the property intending to turn it into a company retreat for their clients, executives and staff to visit. This was a way for the corporation to incentivize its staff to work better and draw in new clients. At first, the property was only accessible by boat or plane as there were no roads leading to the retreat. The corporation had many planes to bring their guests back and forth and some visitors came to the retreat on their own. They had plans to expand the retreat by building more cabins and putting in a road.

In 1962, a road leading to the retreat was built and the Fruehauf Trailer Corporation sold the property to Maury and Annabelle East. The East’s had previously owned resorts and had had successful experiences in the past. Their goal was to expand the resort by adding in more cabins and dining halls and cultivating additional outdoor experiences to be able to accommodate more guests. The couple was very successful during their time of owning Killarney Mountain Lodge. In 2015 the East’s sold the lodge to its current owner, Holden Rhodes.

Holden Rhodes 
Rhodes had a vision for the Killarney Mountain Lodge. He wanted to invest in his community to keep it alive. Rhodes' mother was born and raised in Killarney and his ancestors go back to the founding of the town. Killarney was originally an impoverished community. Rhodes wanted to transform the resort to give back to the community and increase the tourist traffic in Killarney. He had big plans to renovating the resort to create something that is new yet still remembers the history of the town of Killarney. The largest addition to the property that Rhodes developed was the conference centre.

Occupation 
The Killarney Mountain Lodge is currently open only during the summer months up until the beginning of fall. The lodge plans on extending its open season to all year round. In order to do this more cabins and dining halls will need to be built to accommodate their guests. Canada House is also important to this expansion, it allows for events to take place all round regardless of the weather conditions outside.

Since Rhodes purchased the lodge in 2015, his renovations to the property have created a very noticeable increase in occupation at the lodge. As a result of this, the staff has grown from 24-125 people to accommodate their increase in traffic.

Uses 
The Killarney Mountain Lodge offers a large variety of services to accommodate whatever needs their guests have. There are many cabins and dining halls for the guests who are there to spend time in the Killarney outdoors or for those who are there to attend events happening in the Canada House Conference Centre. Many companies choose the lodge as a destination for corporate retreats. Lots of activities are arranged for the guests such as cruises, sailing, team fish fry, kayaking, canoeing, hiking, bonfires, and wilderness excursions.

Canada House

Design 
The log-built convention center was designed by architects from R. Tomè + Associates, structural engineer Strik Baldinelli Minix Ltd, structural mechanic Emcad and log structure design by Murray Arnott design. The goal of the design was to create a structure that is a landmark and representative of Canadian history. The design was inspired by the grandeur of the Fairmont hotels. Despite its large size, the conference centre is still able to blend into its surroundings as if it’s always been there, due to the use of natural materials and the traditional log cabin building style of architecture. The structure is a total of 34000 square feet and the build cost 18 million dollars to complete. Over 500 people were involved from the initial design to the final construction of the conference centre. Rhodes thought it was important to involve the community in the build process.

Construction 
To recognize the history of the First Nations people and the land they were building on, the construction team hired local log crews on Wikwemikong unceded Indian reservation. They worked hard to harvest over 120 tones of white pine trees. Lots of work went into prepping the logs before they could be assembled. “The logs were stripped of bark and seasoned for several weeks before being hand-shaped with a drawknife; then, they were preassembled at the builder’s yard in a process that included tagging, numbering and disassembling the logs. Finally, the tagged logs were trucked to the construction site and assembled”. The construction techniques used in this build are traditional to the Georgian Bay area.

Materials 
The name "Canada House" comes from the fact that it is constructed from materials sourced from all of Canada.

 1000 logs, eastern white pine from Ontario and Quebec and douglas fir from British Columbia
 18-24inch in diameter
 Eastern white pine used for the walls
 Douglas fir used for the roof
 2500 truckloads of gravel from Sudbury Ontario
 15000 hours of masonry work
 2500 Trees and shrubs put in over the landscape
 Pink granite from the Canadian shield
 White quartz from La Cloche Mountain Range
 Stone from Owen Sound, Ontario and Wiarton, Ontario
 Over 1000 cubed meters of concrete

Use 
The conference centre consists of many rooms designed to host parties of 25 to 250 people. There are five grand halls for larger gatherings used for conferences, weddings, special dinners, banquets or classes. Most of the halls have their own fireplace and bar. Additionally, there are eight smaller meeting rooms for more intimate gatherings. Any of the spaces can be tailored to the needs of the user due to the large size of the rooms tables and chairs can be arranged in a variety of setups. From the two halls on the ground floor of the building, patios lead outside with views of Georgian Bay and the beautiful Killarney landscape. These halls have high ceilings that allow visitors to see the exposed handcrafted log structure. Canada House also has a commercial kitchen used to prepare meals for the guests and for dinners that are hosted in the conference centre. As a way to connect the building to the community, each of the rooms is named after local historical figures, locations or events such as Hole-in-the-wall, Group of Seven, Granite Ridge and Silver Peaks. Lots of indigenous artwork is also hung in the conference centre, most of it done by James Simon Mishibinijima.

References

Resorts in Canada